Jordan competed at the 1996 Summer Olympics in Atlanta, United States.

Athletics

Women's Shot Put 
 Nada Kawar 
 Qualification — 15.28m (→ did not advance, 24th place)

Swimming

Men's 400m Freestyle
Omar Dallal 
Qualification  — 4:41.12 (→ did not advance, 34th place)

Women's 200m individual medley
Mira Ghneim 
Qualification  — 2:56.99 (→ did not advance, 43rd place)

Shooting

Men

References
 Official Olympic Reports

Nations at the 1996 Summer Olympics
1996
1996 in Jordan